Cody Gribble (born September 20, 1990) is an American professional golfer who currently plays on the on the PGA Tour and the Korn Ferry Tour.

Early years
Gribble was born in Dallas, Texas. He played college golf at the University of Texas and won the 2012 NCAA Championship with teammates Dylan Frittelli and Jordan Spieth. Gribble is a left-handed golfer.

Professional career
In 2014, Gribble finished T8 at qualifying school to earn his Web.com Tour card, he finished 27th on the money list in 2015 failing to earn a PGA Tour card by $2,035, but retained his Web.com Tour card for another year. At the 2016 United Leasing & Finance Championship, Gribble was leading by one shot with two holes to play, but after a bogey-bogey finish, he ended the tournament T2, one shot behind eventual winner Séamus Power.

In October 2016, Gribble won his first PGA Tour title at the Sanderson Farms Championship, an alternate event on the PGA Tour. He shot a seven-under final round 65 to win by 4 strokes. Gribble became the 13th left-handed golfer to win a PGA Tour event and the first since Greg Chalmers won the 2016 Barracuda Championship.

Gribble gained media attention at the 2017 Arnold Palmer Invitational at Bay Hill when he tapped an alligator on the tail that was sunning itself on the 6th fairway during the first round of tournament play. The alligator quickly scampered unharmed into a nearby pond.

Amateur wins
2007 Western Junior

Professional wins (1)

PGA Tour wins (1)

Results in major championships 

CUT = missed the half-way cut
"T" = tied for place

See also
2016 Web.com Tour Finals graduates

References

External links

American male golfers
Texas Longhorns men's golfers
PGA Tour golfers
PGA Tour Latinoamérica golfers
Korn Ferry Tour graduates
Golfers from Dallas
Left-handed golfers
1990 births
Living people